Xenu is a figure in the Operating Thetan teachings of Scientology.

Xenu may also refer to:
xenu.net or Operation Clambake, a website critical of Scientology
XENU-AM, an AM radio station in Nuevo Laredo, Tamaulipas, Mexico

See also
 Xemnu, a Marvel Comics character
 Xenu's Link Sleuth, a computer program used to check web site links
 Xinu, an educational research-oriented operating system
 XNU, a computer operating system kernel